Nadanahalli is a small village near Mysore city in Karnataka province of India.

Location
Nadanahalli is located on the eastern side of Mysore city on the T.Narasipura road.  It is at a distance of ten kilometers from Mysore city center.

Demographics
Nandanhalli has 652 families and a total population of 2,808 according to the latest census of 2011.  The literacy rate is 72%.  The head of the village is called a Sarpanch.

Residential suburb
The village status of Nadanahalli is disappearing fast because of fast urbanization.  A large number of housing colonies are appearing and new layouts are developing fast.  Facilities like schools and shopping complexes are also coming up. Several banks have also come up in Nandahahalli.

Notable landmarks
 Rajsekhar Hospital
 Sobha Estate
 Megha Haven

See also
 Chikkahalli Choranahalli
 Sutturu
 Varuna village

Image gallery

References

Suburbs of Mysore